Francis Paré (born June 30, 1987) is a Canadian-Belarusian professional ice hockey forward who is currently playing under contract with Lausanne HC of the National League (NL).

Playing career 
Undrafted, Paré previously played with the Grand Rapids Griffins in the American Hockey League (AHL). On July 27, 2011, Pare signed a two-year, two-way contract extension with the Griffins NHL affiliate, the Detroit Red Wings.

On July 8, 2013, after helping the Griffins capture the Calder Cup, Paré was signed to a two-year contract abroad in Finland with TPS of the SM-liiga. In the following years, Paré played for different teams in the Kontinental Hockey League (KHL), including Metallurg Magnitogorsk, Traktor Chelyabinsk and HC Slovan Bratislava. In 2014, he won the Gagarin Cup with Magnitogorsk. After returning to TPS for a second stint during the 2015–16 season, he again inked a deal with a KHL side, agreeing terms with Medvescak Zagreb in June 2016.

On January 23, 2017, Paré left the KHL and signed a contract with Swiss club, Geneve-Servette HC of the National League A (NLA) for the remainder of the season. He appeared in 8 regular season games, with 11 points.

As a free agent in the off-season, Paré opted to return to the KHL, agreeing to an initial one-year contract for the 2017–18 season with Avtomobilist Yekaterinburg on March 24, 2017.

Paré had two seasons in Yekaterinburg before leaving as a free agent to sign a one-year contract with fellow KHL club, HC Dinamo Minsk, on June 22, 2019.

Paré left Minsk after two seasons, securing a one-year contract with reigning champions, Avangard Omsk, on May 10, 2021. in the 2021–22 season, he collected 2 goals and 4 points through 16 appearances with Avangard before he was released from his contract on November 5, 2021. He continued his career abroad by signing an initial try-out contract and later securing a one-year deal with Swiss club, Lausanne HC of the NL, on December 10, 2021.

International play
On January 26, 2021, the Belarus Ice Hockey Federation announced that Paré had accepted an offer to play for the Belarus men's national ice hockey team in the 2021 IIHF World Championship. He registered 1 assist through 6 games in a 15th place finish with Belarus.

Career statistics

Regular season and playoffs

International

Awards and honours

References

External links

1987 births
Living people
Canadian people of French descent
Sportspeople from Longueuil
Canadian ice hockey centres
Avangard Omsk players
Avtomobilist Yekaterinburg players
Chicoutimi Saguenéens (QMJHL) players
HC Dinamo Minsk players
Genève-Servette HC players
Grand Rapids Griffins players
KHL Medveščak Zagreb players
Lausanne HC players
Metallurg Magnitogorsk players
Shawinigan Cataractes players
HC Slovan Bratislava players
Traktor Chelyabinsk players
HC TPS players
Canadian expatriate ice hockey players in Slovakia
Canadian expatriate ice hockey players in Croatia
Canadian expatriate ice hockey players in Finland
Canadian expatriate ice hockey players in Russia
Canadian expatriate ice hockey players in Switzerland
Belarusian ice hockey centres
Naturalized citizens of Belarus
Canadian expatriate ice hockey players in the United States
Canadian expatriate ice hockey players in Belarus
Belarusian expatriate sportspeople in Russia
Belarusian expatriate sportspeople in Switzerland